Banner Elk Hotel is a historic hotel building located at Banner Elk, Avery County, North Carolina. The original section of the hotel dates to about 1856, with expansions made between 1877 and 1891. Two-story rear wings and smaller additions were made between 1891 and 1898.  It was originally built as a dwelling house, later expanded and converted for use as a hotel.  It is a rambling, frame, "U"-shaped two-story building covered with weatherboard siding.

It was listed on the National Register of Historic Places in 2000.  The hotel building has since been demolished.

References

Hotel buildings on the National Register of Historic Places in North Carolina
Houses completed in 1856
Buildings and structures in Avery County, North Carolina
National Register of Historic Places in Avery County, North Carolina